Ledipasvir is a drug for the treatment of hepatitis C that was developed by Gilead Sciences. After completing  Phase III clinical trials, on February 10, 2014, Gilead filed for U.S. approval of a ledipasvir/sofosbuvir fixed-dose combination tablet for genotype 1 hepatitis C.  The ledipasvir/sofosbuvir combination is a direct-acting antiviral agent that interferes with HCV replication and can be used to treat patients with genotypes 1a or 1b without PEG-interferon or ribavirin.

Ledipasvir is an inhibitor of NS5A, a hepatitis C virus protein.

Data presented at the 20th Conference on Retroviruses and Opportunistic Infections in March 2013 showed that a triple regimen of the nucleotide analog inhibitor sofosbuvir, ledipasvir, and ribavirin produced a 12-week post-treatment sustained virological response (SVR12) rate of 100% for both treatment-naive patients and prior non-responders with HCV genotype 1. The sofosbuvir/ledipasvir coformulation is being tested with and without ribavirin. In February 2014 Gilead filed for United States Food and Drug Administration (FDA) approval of ledipasvir/sofosbuvir oral treatment, without interferon and ribavirin.

On 10 October 2014 the FDA approved the combination product ledipasvir/sofosbuvir called Harvoni.

Medical uses 
Ledipasvir is most commonly used in combination with sofosbuvir for treatment in chronic hepatitis C genotype 1 patients. This drug has been tested and shown efficacy in treatment-naive and treatment experienced patients.

Adverse effects 
According to clinical trials, ledipasvir/sofosbuvir has been very well tolerated with the most common side effects being fatigue and headache.

Interactions 
Most drug-drug interactions with Harvoni involve Pgp-inducers such as St. John’s wort or rifampicin. Concomitant use will decrease the blood concentration of Harvoni and thus, have reduced therapeutic effects.

Mechanism of action 
Ledipasvir inhibits an important viral phosphoprotein, NS5A, which is involved in viral replication, assembly, and secretion.

Sofosbuvir, on the other hand, is metabolized to a uridine triphosphate mimic, which acts as a RNA chain terminator when incorporated into RNA by NS5B polymerase.

Cost 
Similar to sofosbuvir, the cost of Harvoni has been a controversial topic. It costs $1,125 per pill in the US, translating to $63,000 for an 8-week treatment course, $94,500 for a 12-week treatment course, or $189,000 for a 24-week treatment course. Gilead justifies the cost by outweighing the benefit of curing hepatitis C over the cost of spending double on liver transplants or temporarily treating liver diseases. Gilead has provided a ledipasvir/sofosbuvir assistance program for eligible underserved or underinsured hepatitis C patients who cannot afford the costs of treatment.

In July 2015 Gilead modified the eligibility criteria to receive Support Path benefits for HCV patients in the United States.

See also 
 Discovery and development of NS5A inhibitors

References 

NS5A inhibitors
Fluorenes
Carbamates
Benzimidazoles
Cyclopropanes
Imidazoles
Breakthrough therapy
World Health Organization essential medicines
Organofluorides